Gerd Kashaneh (also Romanized as Gerd Kashāneh and Gerdak Shāneh; also known as Qertīq Shaneh) is a city in, and the capital of, Lajan District of Piranshahr County, West Azerbaijan province, Iran. At the 2006 census, its population was 1,316 in 260 households. The following census in 2011 counted 1,673 people in 352 households. The latest census in 2016 showed a population of 4,201 people in 1,073 households.

References 

Piranshahr County

Cities in West Azerbaijan Province

Populated places in West Azerbaijan Province

Populated places in Piranshahr County